Hubbard Hill is a mountain in Schoharie County, New York. It is located east-southeast of North Blenheim. Leonard Hill is located northwest and High Knob is located southeast of Hubbard Hill.

References

Mountains of Schoharie County, New York
Mountains of New York (state)